Benoît is a French male given name. It is less frequently spelled Benoist. The name comes from the Latin word , which means "the one who says the good", equivalent in meaning to Bénédicte or the English name Benedict. A female derivative of the name is Benoîte.

The personal name Benoît is to be distinguished from Benoit as a family name, which is usually spelled without the circumflex accent. Early form of the name was spelled with an "s" (Benoist), but as with many words in the French language, the "s" was eventually replaced with a circumflex accent over the "i".

Benoît in other languages
Arabic: بندكتوس
Aragonese: Benedet
Asturian: Benitu
Basque: Beñat
Breton: Beneat
Catalan : Benet
Croatian : Benedikt
Danish: Benedikt, Bendt
Czech: Benedikt, Beneš
Dutch: Benedictus, Benoot
English: Benedict
Finnish: Benediktus, Pentti
Galician : Bieito
German : Benedikt
Greek: Βενέδικτος (Venediktos)
Hungarian: Benedek
Irish: Bennett
Italian: Benedetto, Benito
Latin: Benedictus
Latvian: Benedikts, Bendiks, Benis
Norwegian: Benedikt, Bendik
Polish: Benedykt
Portuguese: Benedito, Bento
Provençal: Bénézet
Romanian: Benedict
Russian: Венедикт
Slovak: Benedikt, Beňadik
Slovenian: Benedikt
Spanish: Benedicto, Benito
Swedish: Benedikt, Bengt
Ukrainian: Бенедикт, Венедикт
Yiddish: Benesh

Benoist as a given name
 Benoist Simmat , French author and journalist 
 Benoist Stehlin (c. 1732 – 1774), French harpsichord builder

Benoît as a given name
 Benoît Assou-Ekotto (born 1984), Cameroonian footballer
 Benoît Badiashile (born 2001), French footballer
 Benoit Benjamin (born 1964), American basketball player
 Benoît Bouchard (born 1940), Canadian public official and former politician
 Benoît Brunet (born 1968), Canadian retired hockey player
 Benoît Charest (born 1964), Canadian guitarist and film score composer
 Benoit Charette (born 1976), Canadian politician 
 Benoît Paul Émile Clapeyron (1799–1864), French engineer and physicist
 Benoît-Constant Coquelin (1841–1909), French stage and film actor
 Benoît David (born 1966), Canadian singer
 Benoît Dorémus (born 1980) French singer-songwriter 
 Benoît Ferreux (born 1955), French film actor
 Benoît Jacquot (born 1947), French film director
 Benoît Lacroix (1915– 2016), Canadian theologian, philosopher, Dominican priest, professor and historian 
 Benoît Hamon (born 1967), French former MEP and current spokesperson for the Socialist Party of France
 Benoît Hogue (born 1966), Canadian retired hockey player
 Benoît Magimel (born 1974), French actor
 Benoît Mandelbrot (1924–2010), French mathematician, the "father of fractal geometry"
 Benoît Paire (born 1989), French professional tennis player
 Benoît Pedretti (born 1980), French football (soccer) player
 Benoît Peeters (born 1956), French comics writer, novelist, and critic
 Benoît Poelvoorde (born 1964), Belgian actor
 Benoît de Sainte-Maure (before 1160 – 1173), medieval French poet
 Benoît Sokal (1954–2021), Belgian comic artist and video game developer
 Benoît Tréluyer (born 1976), French race car driver 
 Benoît Tremblay (born 1948), former member of the Canadian House of Commons
 Benoît Vaugrenard (born 1982), French professional cyclist

Benoist as a family name
 Melissa Benoist (b. 1988), American actress and singer
 Alain de Benoist (b. 1943), French academic and philosopher
 Antoine Benoist (painter) (1632–1717), French artist who was painter and sculptor to Louis XIV
 Antoine-Gabriel-François Benoist (1715–1776), French soldier
 Élie Benoist (1640–1728), French Protestant minister, known as an historian of the Edict of Nantes
 Félix Benoist (1818–1896), French painter and lithographer
 François Benoist (1794–1878), French organist, composer, and pedagogue
 Gabriel Benoist (1891–1964), a French writer in the Cauchois dialect of the Norman language
 Guillaume Philippe Benoist (1725–1770), French line-engraver
 Jacques Benoist-Méchin (1901–1983), French politician and writer
 Joseph Roger de Benoist (b. ? ), French missionary, journalist, and historian
 Lance Benoist (b. 1988), American mixed martial artist 
 Louis Auguste Benoist (1803–1867), pioneering American banker and financier
 Luc Benoist (1893–1980), French essayist
 Marcel Benoist (died 1918), French lawyer who established the Swiss Marcel Benoist Prize
 Marie Guilhelmine Benoist (1768–1826), French neoclassical, historical and genre painter.
 Michel Benoist (1715–1774),  French Jesuit scientist noted for his service to the Chinese Empire
 Raymond Benoist (1881–1970), French zoologist and botanist
 Robert Benoist (1895–1944), French Grand Prix motor racing driver and World War II secret agent
 Thomas W. Benoist (1874–1917), American aviator, aircraft manufacturer, and airline entrepreneur

Benoit as a family name
André Benoit (born 1984), Canadian hockey player
Avril Benoit (before 1990), Canadian broadcast journalist
Bob Benoit (horse racing) (1927–2008), general manager of the Hollywood Park race track
Brian Benoit (before 1999), American metal-core guitarist
Chris Benoit (1967–2007), Canadian professional wrestler
Clinton Benoit (born 1973), Haitian musician
Christine Benoit (born 1972), Seychellois Anglican priest
David Benoit (basketball) (born 1968), American basketball player
David Benoit (musician) (born 1953), American jazz fusion pianist
Georges Benoît (1883–1942), French cinematographer and actor 
Hubert Benoit (born 1963), Canadian politician
Hubert Benoit (psychotherapist) (1904-1992) French psychotherapist
Jason Benoit (born 1984),  Canadian Country Music Singer/Songwriter 
Joan Benoit (born 1957), American first women's Olympic marathon champion
Joaquín Benoit (born 1977), Dominican professional baseball pitcher
John J. Benoit (1951-2016), American law enforcement officer and politician
Justin-Mirande René Benoit (1844–1922), French physicist
Kelly Benoit-Bird (born 1976), American scientist
Leon Benoit (born 1950), Canadian politician
Luigi Benoit (1804–1890), Italian ornithologist and conchologist
Maurice Benoît ("Moe") (born 1933), Canadian professional hockey player
Michel Benoit (chess player) (born 1949), French chess player
Nancy Benoit (1964–2007), American professional wrestling valet and wife of Chris Benoit
Nicole Schnyder-Benoit (born 1973), Swiss beach volleyball player
Paul Benoit (composer) (born 1893), French monk and composer of organ music
Pedro Benoit (1836–1897), Argentine architect, engineer and urbanist
Peter Benoit (1834–1901), Belgian composer
Pierre Benoit (archaeologist) (1906–1987), born Maurice Benoit, French theologian
Pierre Benoit (MLA) (1824–1870), Quebec politician
Pierre Benoit (novelist) (1886–1962), French novelist
Pierre Benoit (Ontario politician) (born 1939), Canadian lawyer and politician, former mayor of Ottawa, Ontario
Pierre Basile Benoit (1837–1910), Canadian farmer and political figure
Ryan Benoit (born 1989), American mixed martial artist
Silvia Benoit, Swiss female curler, European champion
Simon Benoît (born 1998), Canadian ice hockey player
Tab Benoit (born 1967), American blues guitarist
Ted Benoit (1947 - 2016), French comics artist, graphic novelist
Yasmin Benoit (born 1996), English model and activist

French masculine given names
French-language surnames
Surnames from given names